The Box Hill artists' camp was a site in Box Hill, Victoria, Australia favoured by a group of plein air painters in the mid to late 1880s who later became associated with the Heidelberg School art movement, also known as Australian impressionism.

History
In the summer of 1885–86, plein air painters Tom Roberts, Frederick McCubbin and Louis Abrahams set up a tent near Damper Creek (now Gardiners Creek) on the property of David Houston, in the Box Hill area east of Melbourne. They were attracted to Box Hill due to its rural scenery and tracts of untouched bushland while also being easily accessible from the city, the Box Hill railway station having opened three years prior.

Painting activities were carried out on weekends by the trio over the next few years and at various times other artists joined them, including Arthur Streeton, Charles Conder, Jane Sutherland, Tom Humphrey, John Llewellyn Jones and John Mather. By 1889, these artists had moved on from Box Hill and founded other camps around Melbourne, most notably at Heidelberg.

Notable works painted in and around the Box Hill camp include:

The artists' camp (Roberts, 1886)
A summer morning tiff (Roberts, 1886) 
Lost (McCubbin, 1886)
Gathering mistletoe (McCubbin, 1886]
Obstruction (Sutherland, 1887)
Reconciliation (Roberts, 1887)
Settler's Camp (Streeton, 1888)
Pastoral (Streeton, 1888)
The way to school (Humphrey, 1888)
Orchard at Box Hill (Conder, 1888)
Down on His Luck (McCubbin 1889)

Legacy
The artists remembered the Box Hill era with great fondness and nostalgia. In old age, Roberts recalled:

The site is located within the now suburbanised area of Box Hill South and is commemorated by a cairn in Artists Park off Prince Street. Other local tributes to the camp include the Roberts McCubbin Primary School and the Whitehorse Artists' Trail.

Gallery

See also
Art of Australia
Heidelberg School
Montsalvat
One Summer Again, 1985 docudrama
Heide Circle

References

External links
In the Artist's Footsteps
Walkabout - Box Hill

Heidelberg School
Impressionism
Australian art
Arts in Melbourne
Australian artist groups and collectives
City of Whitehorse